"Rubberband Girl" is a song by English singer-songwriter Kate Bush that was the first of five singles released from her seventh studio album, The Red Shoes (1993). The song marked Bush's return from her third three-year hiatus. Not counting "Rocket Man" (her contribution to the Elton John and Bernie Taupin tribute album Two Rooms: Celebrating the Songs of Elton John & Bernie Taupin in 1991), this was her first UK release in 39 months.

Three different versions of "Rubberband Girl" were released commercially: an LP, an extended mix and a remix by American DJ Eric Kupper called the US Mix, which was released towards the end of 1994 on the "And So Is Love" single. The B-side to the single is "Big Stripey Lie" in the UK and "Show a Little Devotion" in the US.

The single was released on 6 September 1993 and peaked at number 12 on the UK Singles Chart, becoming Bush's last top-twenty hit in her native country until "King of the Mountain" reached number four in 2005. The song was a moderate success worldwide, reaching the top 40 in Australia, Ireland, the Netherlands and New Zealand.  In the United States, it was a number-88 hit on the Billboard Hot 100 chart.

In 2011, Kate Bush recorded a new version of the song that was included on her ninth studio album, Director's Cut.

Critical reception
Alan Jones from Music Week gave the song four out of five and named it Pick of the Week, writing, "With Kate at the helm any single would be quirky but by her own otherwordly standards this is Ms. Bush at her most direct." He added, "It's a rhythmic, almost raunchy, workout with the occasional outburst of rock guitar, strange lyrics — "if I could twang like a rubberband, l'd be a rubberband girl" is as ordinary as it gets — and a weird vocal impression of said office accessory being stretched. It is also a very commercial rejoinder and will probably be Kate's first Top 10 solo hit since "Running Up That Hill" hit the spot eight years ago." Parry Gettelman from Orlando Sentinel said that "Bush waxes positively perky as she struggles to forge a "Sledgehammer" out of a flimsy tune, dopey lyrics and bouncy dance-floor beat." Richard C. Walls from Rolling Stone noted the "pure pop" of "Rubberband Girl". Tom Doyle from Smash Hits also gave the song four out of five, saying that it's "a bit of a shock because she's gone all funky with Prince-ish drums all over the shop".

Track listings

Personnel
Kate Bush – vocals, keyboards
Danny McIntosh – guitar
John Giblin – bass guitar
Stuart Elliott – drums, percussion
Nigel Hitchcock – tenor and baritone saxophones
Steve Sidwell – trumpet
Paul Spong – trumpet
Neil Sidwell – trombone

Charts

References

1993 singles
1993 songs
Columbia Records singles
EMI Records singles
Kate Bush songs
Songs written by Kate Bush